John Lineker (born June 12, 1990), is a Brazilian mixed martial artist currently signed to ONE Championship, where he is the former ONE Bantamweight World Champion. Lineker formerly competed in the Bantamweight division of the Ultimate Fighting Championship. A professional competitor since 2008, he is the former Jungle Fight Bantamweight Champion. Lineker is known for his aggressive fighting style, punching power, and durability. As of March 6, 2023, he is ranked #1 in the ONE Bantamweight rankings.

Mixed martial arts career

Early career
Lineker competed in various promotions in his native Brazil, including Samurai FC, Shooto Americas, and Jungle Fight.  He is the former Jungle Fight Bantamweight Champion and Nitrix Fights 2011 Bantamweight Grand Prix Champion.

Lineker made his professional MMA debut in September 2008.  Originally he fought in the lightweight and featherweight divisions, outside of his natural weight class.  He competed 11 times in the first 15 months of his career, resulting in a lackluster record of six wins and five losses.

Beginning in 2010, Lineker moved down in weight classes to the bantamweight and flyweight divisions. After that move, he was undefeated in the 13 bouts prior to his UFC debut.

Ultimate Fighting Championship
In December 2011, it was announced that Lineker had signed with the Ultimate Fighting Championship to compete in their new flyweight division.

Lineker made his UFC debut against Louis Gaudinot at UFC on Fox: Diaz vs. Miller on May 5, 2012.  The bout was contested at a catchweight of 127 lb, as Lineker missed weight. Gaudinot defeated Lineker via technical submission (guillotine choke) in the 2nd round after an action-packed, back-and-forth first two rounds. Both participants earned Fight of the Night honors for their performances.

Lineker was expected to face Yasuhiro Urushitani on September 1, 2012, at UFC 151. However, after UFC 151 was cancelled, Lineker/Urushitani was rescheduled and took place on November 10, 2012, at UFC on Fuel TV 6. In a competitive three rounds, Lineker's power was the difference in the fight as he edged Urushitani via unanimous decision.

For his third UFC fight, Lineker faced Azamat Gashimov on May 18, 2013, at UFC on FX 8. He won the fight via TKO in the second round.

Lineker was expected to face Phil Harris on August 3, 2013, at UFC 163. However, Harris was forced out of the bout and Lineker instead faced promotional newcomer José Maria. Lineker missed the 126 pound weight limit for a non-title flyweight fight, weighing in at 129 pounds. As a result, he surrendered 20 percent of his purse to his opponent and the bout was changed to a 129-pound catchweight affair. After a back-and-forth first round, Lineker won the fight via TKO in the second round.

Following that victory, Lineker was once again scheduled to face off against Phil Harris on October 26, 2013, at UFC Fight Night 30, and he won the fight by TKO. Lineker missed weight for the third time in his UFC career, causing his camp to re-assess his weight class.

Lineker faced Ali Bagautinov on February 1, 2014, at UFC 169. Lineker again missed weight on his first attempt. He was allowed one hour to make the weight and succeeded after 45 minutes. He lost the fight via unanimous decision.

Lineker faced Alp Ozkilic on July 16, 2014, at UFC Fight Night 45. He won the fight via KO due to punches in the third round. The win also garnered Lineker his second Fight of the Night bonus award.

Lineker was expected to face Ian McCall on November 8, 2014, at UFC Fight Night 56 as the co-main event. However, just hours after both fighters had successfully made weight, it was announced that Mccall had been pulled from the event due to a blood infection. The bout was scrapped from the event entirely.

The bout with McCall eventually took place on January 31, 2015, at UFC 183. At the weigh in, Lineker again failed to make the flyweight weight limit. He was over by four pounds and was subsequently fined 30% of this purse. Because of the repeated failed weigh ins, he was forced to move up to the bantamweight division (135lb). He won the bout by unanimous decision.

Making his bantamweight return, Lineker faced Francisco Rivera in a bantamweight bout on September 5, 2015 at UFC 191. He won the fight via submission in the first round. The wild slugfest earned both participants, Fight of the Night honors.

Lineker was expected to face Cody Garbrandt on February 21, 2016, at UFC Fight Night 83. However, Lineker pulled out of the fight during the week leading up to the event citing illness and was replaced by Augusto Mendes.

Lineker faced Rob Font on May 14, 2016, at UFC 198. He won the fight via unanimous decision in round 3.

Lineker next faced Michael McDonald on July 13, 2016, at UFC Fight Night 91. He won the fight via knockout in the first round and was awarded a Performance of the Night bonus.

Lineker faced John Dodson on October 1, 2016, at UFC Fight Night 96. The bout took place at a catchweight of 136.5 lbs as Lineker missed weight. He won the back and forth fight via split decision.

Lineker faced former UFC Bantamweight Champion T.J. Dillashaw on December 30, 2016, at UFC 207. He lost via unanimous decision.

Lineker faced Marlon Vera on October 28, 2017, at UFC Fight Night 119. He won the fight via unanimous decision.

Lineker was scheduled to face Jimmie Rivera on December 30, 2017 at UFC 219, replacing the injured Dominick Cruz. On December 24, it was reported that Lineker was forced to pull from the fight due to tooth infection.
 Subsequently the fight was cancelled.

Lineker faced Brian Kelleher on May 12, 2018, at UFC 224. He won the fight via knockout in the third round.

Lineker was expected to face Dominick Cruz on January 26, 2019, at UFC 233. It was reported on December 11, 2018 that Cruz injured his shoulder and pulled out of the fight. As a result of the cancellation of UFC 233, Lineker was rescheduled to face Cory Sandhagen at UFC Fight Night 143. However, it was reported on January 10, 2019, that Lineker was pulled from the bout due to rib injury.

The bout with Sandhagen was rescheduled and eventually took place on April 27, 2019, at UFC Fight Night: Jacaré vs. Hermansson. Lineker lost the fight via split decision.

Lineker was scheduled to face Rob Font on June 22, 2019, at UFC Fight Night 154, replacing injured Cody Stamann. In turn, Lineker was pulled from the bout for undisclosed reasons.

On July 2, 2019, it was announced that Lineker had been released by UFC, and was signed by ONE Championship on July 8, 2019.

ONE Championship
Lineker made his promotional debut against Muin Gafurov at ONE Championship: Dawn Of Valor on October 26, 2019. He won the fight by unanimous decision.

Lineker made his sophomore appearance in the organization against Kevin Belingon at ONE Championship: Inside the Matrix 3 on November 13, 2020. He defeated Belingon by second-round technical knockout.

Lineker was scheduled to face Stephen Loman at ONE on TNT 4 on April 28, 2021. Loman would later withdraw from the card, as he tested positive for COVID-19, and was replaced by Troy Worthen. He won the bout via KO in the first round.

Lineker was scheduled to face reigning champion Bibiano Fernandes for the ONE Bantamweight Championship at ONE: X on December 3, 2021. However due to the pandemic, the event was postponed and the bout was moved to ONE: Bad Blood on February 11, 2022. Lineker tested positive for COVID days before the event and the bout was pulled. The bout was rescheduled for ONE: Lights Out on March 11, 2022. Lineker won the fight by second-round knockout to become the new ONE Bantamweight World Champion. The win also earned him a Performance of the Night bonus.

Lineker was scheduled to make his first bantamweight title defense against Fabrício Andrade at ONE on Prime Video 3 on October 21, 2022. At weigh-ins, John Lineker missed weight, coming in at 145.75 lbs, .75 pounds over the limit. Lineker was stripped of the ONE Bantamweight World Championship and the bout proceeded at a catchweight with only Andrade being able to win the title. Andrade also got 20% of his purse. During the beginning of the third round, Andrade accidentally connected with a strike to the groin of Lineker, who could not continue. The fight was declared a no contest.

A rematch between Lineker and Andrade for the vacant ONE Bantamweight World Championship took place on February 25, 2023, at ONE Fight Night 7. He lost the bout by technical knockout after his corner stopped the fight after the fourth round.

Personal life
Lineker and his wife, Jacklyne, have five children.

Championships and accomplishments
ONE Championship
ONE Bantamweight World Championship (one time)
Performance of the Night (One time) 
Ultimate Fighting Championship
Fight of the Night (three times) 
Performance of the Night (one time) 
Jungle Fight 
Jungle Fight Bantamweight Championship (one time)
Nitrix Champion Fight 
Nitrix Fights Bantamweight Grand Prix

Mixed martial arts record 

|-
|Loss
|align=center|
|Fabrício Andrade
|TKO (corner stoppage)
|ONE Fight Night 7
|
|align=center|4 
|align=center|5:00 
|Bangkok, Thailand
|
|-
|NC
|align=center|35–9 (1)
|Fabrício Andrade
|No Contest (accidental groin strike)
|ONE on Prime Video 3
|
|align=center| 3
|align=center| 2:44
|Kuala Lumpur, Malaysia
|
|-
|Win
|align=center|35–9
| Bibiano Fernandes
|KO (punch)
| ONE: Lights Out
| 
|align=center|2
|align=center|3:40 
| Kallang, Singapore
|  
|-
|Win
|align=center|34–9
|Troy Worthen
|KO (punch)
|ONE on TNT 3
|
|align=center|1
|align=center|4:35
|Kallang, Singapore
|
|-
|Win
|align=center|33–9
|Kevin Belingon
|TKO (punches)
| ONE: Inside the Matrix 3
|
|align=center|2
|align=center|1:16
|Kallang, Singapore
|
|-
|Win
|align=center|32–9
|Muin Gafurov
|Decision (unanimous)
| ONE: Dawn Of Valor
|
|align=center|3
|align=center|5:00
|Jakarta,  Indonesia
|
|-
|Loss
|align=center|31–9
|Cory Sandhagen
|Decision (split)
|UFC Fight Night: Jacaré vs. Hermansson 
|
|align=center|3
|align=center|5:00
|Sunrise, Florida, United States
|
|-
|Win
|align=center|31–8
|Brian Kelleher
|KO (punch)
|UFC 224
|
|align=center|3
|align=center|3:43
|Rio de Janeiro, Brazil
| 
|-
|Win
|align=center|30–8
|Marlon Vera
|Decision (unanimous)
|UFC Fight Night: Brunson vs. Machida
|
|align=center|3
|align=center|5:00
|São Paulo, Brazil
|
|-
|Loss
|align=center|29–8
|T.J. Dillashaw
|Decision (unanimous)
|UFC 207
|
|align=center|3
|align=center|5:00
|Las Vegas, Nevada, United States
| 
|-
|Win
|align=center|29–7
|John Dodson
|Decision (split)
|UFC Fight Night: Lineker vs. Dodson
|
|align=center|5
|align=center|5:00
|Portland, Oregon, United States
|
|-
|Win
|align=center|28–7
|Michael McDonald
|KO (punches)
|UFC Fight Night: McDonald vs. Lineker
|
|align=center|1
|align=center|2:43
|Sioux Falls, South Dakota, United States
|
|-
|Win
|align=center|27–7
|Rob Font
|Decision (unanimous)
|UFC 198
|
|align=center|3
|align=center|5:00
|Curitiba, Brazil
| 
|-
|Win
|align=center|26–7
|Francisco Rivera
|Submission (guillotine choke)
|UFC 191
|
|align=center|1
|align=center|2:08
|Las Vegas, Nevada, United States
|
|-
|Win
|align=center| 25–7
|Ian McCall
|Decision (unanimous)
|UFC 183
|
|align=center|3
|align=center|5:00
|Las Vegas, Nevada, United States
|
|-
|Win
|align=center| 24–7
|Alp Ozkilic
|TKO (punches)
|UFC Fight Night: Cowboy vs. Miller
|
|align=center|3
|align=center|4:51
|Atlantic City, New Jersey, United States
|
|-
|Loss
|align=center| 23–7
|Ali Bagautinov
|Decision (unanimous)
|UFC 169
|
|align=center|3
|align=center|5:00
|Newark, New Jersey, United States
|
|-
|Win
|align=center| 23–6
|Phil Harris
|TKO (punches)
|UFC Fight Night: Machida vs. Munoz
|
|align=center| 1
|align=center| 2:51
|Manchester, England
|
|-
|Win
|align=center| 22–6
|José Maria Tomé
|TKO (punches)
|UFC 163
|
|align=center| 2
|align=center| 1:03
|Rio de Janeiro, Brazil
|
|-
|Win
|align=center| 21–6
|Azamat Gashimov
|TKO (punches)
|UFC on FX: Belfort vs. Rockhold
|
|align=center| 2
|align=center| 1:07
|Jaraguá do Sul, Brazil
| 
|-
|Win
|align=center| 20–6 
|Yasuhiro Urushitani
|Decision (unanimous)
|UFC on Fuel TV: Franklin vs. Le
|
|align=center| 3
|align=center| 5:00
|Macau, SAR
|
|-
|Loss
|align=center| 19–6
|Louis Gaudinot
|Technical Submission (guillotine choke)
|UFC on Fox: Diaz vs. Miller
|
|align=center| 2
|align=center| 4:54
|East Rutherford, New Jersey, United States
|
|-
|Win
|align=center| 19–5
|Iliarde Santos
|Decision (split)
|Jungle Fight 32
|
|align=center| 3
|align=center| 5:00
|São Paulo, Brazil
|
|-
|Win
|align=center| 18–5
|Francisco Figueiredo
|TKO (punches)
|Jungle Fight 30
|
|align=center| 3
|align=center| 0:36
|Belém, Brazil
| 
|-
|Win
|align=center| 17–5
|Luiz Salgadinho 
|KO (punch)
|Jungle Fight 28
|
|align=center| 1
|align=center| 1:18
|Rio de Janeiro, Brazil
| 
|-
|Win
|align=center| 16–5
|Renato Velame
|Submission (rear-naked choke)
|Jungle Fight 27
|
|align=center| 1
|align=center| 2:58
|Brasília, Brazil
| 
|-
|Win
|align=center| 15–5
|Saulo Martins
|TKO (punches)
|Shooto - Brazil 22
|
|align=center| 1
|align=center| 3:30
|Brasília, Brazil
| 
|-
|Win
|align=center| 14–5
|Diego D'Avila
|Decision (unanimous)
|rowspan=2|Nitrix - Champion Fight 6
|rowspan=2|
|align=center| 3
|align=center| 5:00
|rowspan=2|Brusque, Brazil
|
|-
|Win
|align=center| 13–5
|Alessandro Cordeiro
|TKO (punches)
|align=center| 1
|align=center| 3:44
|
|-
|Win
|align=center| 12–5
|Felipe Alves
|Submission (rear-naked choke)
|Gladiators Fighting Championship 2
|
|align=center| 2
|align=center| 2:05
|Curitiba, Brazil
| 
|-
|Win
|align=center| 11–5
|Alvino José Torres
|Submission (rear-naked choke)
|Shooto - Brazil 18
|
|align=center| 2
|align=center| N/A
|Brasília, Brazil
| 
|-
|Win
|align=center| 10–5
|Jetron Azevedo
|Decision (unanimous)
|Gladiators Fighting Championship 1
|
|align=center| 3
|align=center| 5:00
|Curitiba, Brazil
| 
|-
|Win
|align=center| 9–5
|Israel Silva
|Decision (unanimous)
|K.O. - Fight 3
|
|align=center| 3
|align=center| 5:00
|Apucarana, Brazil
| 
|-
|Win
|align=center| 8–5
|Larry Vargas
|DQ (punches after the bell)
|rowspan=2|Full Heroes Battle 2
|rowspan=2|
|align=center| 2
|align=center| 5:00
|rowspan=2|Paranaguá, Brazil
| 
|-
|Win
|align=center| 7–5
|Cica Cica
|Decision (unanimous)
|align=center| 3
|align=center| 5:00
| 
|-
|Loss
|align=center| 6–5
|Rafael Silva
|Decision (unanimous)
|Warrior's Challenge 4
|
|align=center| 3
|align=center| 5:00
|Porto Belo, Brazil
|
|-
|Win
|align=center| 6–4
|Wagner Campos
|TKO (punches)
|Brazilian Fight League 5
|
|align=center| 2
|align=center| N/A
|Curitiba, Brazil
| 
|-
|Loss
|align=center| 5–4
|Andre Luis
|Decision (unanimous)
|Samurai FC - Samurai Fight Combat
|
|align=center| 3
|align=center| 5:00
|Curitiba, Brazil
| 
|-
|Loss
|align=center| 5–3
|Erick Carlos Silva
|Decision (unanimous)
|Blackout FC 3
|
|align=center| 3
|align=center| 5:00
|Balneário Camboriú, Brazil
| 
|-
|Loss
|align=center| 5–2
|Felipe Arantes
|Submission (armbar)
|Paranagua Fight 5
|
|align=center| 1
|align=center| 1:12
|Paranaguá, Brazil
| 
|-
|Win
|align=center| 5–1
|Márcio Sapo
|Decision (unanimous)
|Nitrix - Show Fight 2
|
|align=center| 3
|align=center| 5:00
|Joinville, Brazil
| 
|-
|Win
|align=center| 4–1
|Alexandre Chatuba
|TKO (punches)
|VIP - Stage 3
|
|align=center| 2
|align=center| N/A
|Joinville, Brazil
| 
|-
|Loss
|align=center| 3–1
|Nelson Velasques
|Submission (rear-naked choke)
|Golden Fighters 1
|
|align=center| 1
|align=center| 4:02
|Novo Hamburgo, Brazil
| 
|-
|Win
|align=center| 3–0
|Claudinei Rodriguez
|Decision (unanimous)
|Floripa Fight 5
|
|align=center| 3
|align=center| 5:00
|Florianópolis, Brazil
| 
|-
|Win
|align=center| 2–0
|Heriton Alves
|KO (punches)
|Paranagua Fight 3
|
|align=center| 1
|align=center| N/A
|Paranaguá, Brazil
| 
|-
|Win
|align=center| 1–0
|Mauricio Alves
|TKO (punches)
|Paranagua Fight 2
|
|align=center| 2
|align=center| 1:25
|Paranaguá, Brazil
|

See also
 List of current ONE fighters
 List of male mixed martial artists

References

Notes

External links
 John Lineker at ONE
 
 
 Official John Lineker Tee KO Page

1990 births
Living people
Brazilian male mixed martial artists
Brazilian practitioners of Brazilian jiu-jitsu
Brazilian Muay Thai practitioners
Flyweight mixed martial artists
Mixed martial artists utilizing boxing
Mixed martial artists utilizing Muay Thai
Mixed martial artists utilizing Brazilian jiu-jitsu
Ultimate Fighting Championship male fighters
People from Paranaguá
Sportspeople from Paraná (state)
ONE Championship champions